The No. 101 Wireless Set was a wireless radio transceiver used by the Australian Army during the Second World War. The unit was made by the Australian company Amalgamated Wireless.

External links
https://web.archive.org/web/20150509034359/http://www.vk2bv.org/museum/au-wwii.htm

World War II Australian electronics
Military equipment of the Australian Army
Military radio systems